Koheda is a village and a mandal in Ranga Reddy district in the state of Telangana in India.

References 

Villages in Ranga Reddy district